Gabriel Taraburelli (born 21 April 1981) was an Argentine taekwondo practitioner. He competed at the 2000 Summer Olympics.

References

1981 births
Olympic taekwondo practitioners of Argentina
Taekwondo practitioners at the 2000 Summer Olympics
Living people
Sportspeople from Buenos Aires Province
21st-century Argentine people